This article contains a list of Encyclicals of Pope Pius X.  Pope Pius X issued 17 papal encyclicals during his reign as Pope:

Pius 10
Pope Pius X